Douglas Charles Thomas Reid (September 3, 1924 – March 17, 2007) was a Canadian football player who played for the Calgary Stampeders and BC Lions. He played college football at the University of British Columbia. He is a member of the UBC Sports Hall of Fame. He died in 2007.

References

1924 births
2007 deaths
BC Lions players
Calgary Stampeders players
Canadian football people from Vancouver
Players of Canadian football from British Columbia
UBC Thunderbirds football players
Canadian football running backs